The 1988 Donnay Indoor Championships was a men's tennis tournament played on indoor carpet courts at the Forest National in Brussels, Belgium the event was part of the 1988 Nabisco Grand Prix. The tournament was held from 21 November until 27 November 1988. First-seeded Henri Leconte won the singles title.

Finals

Singles

 Henri Leconte defeated  Jakob Hlasek, 7–6, 7–6, 6–4

Doubles

 Wally Masur /  Tom Nijssen defeated  John Fitzgerald /  Tomáš Šmíd, 7–5, 7–6

References

Donnay Indoor Championships
Donnay
+